Mirificarma is a genus of moths in the family Gelechiidae.

Species
montivaga species-group
Mirificarma montivaga (Walsingham, 1904)
maculatella species-group
Mirificarma aflavella (Amsel, 1935)
Mirificarma denotata Pitkin, 1984
Mirificarma eburnella (Denis & Schiffermuller, 1775)
Mirificarma flavella (Duponchel, 1844)
Mirificarma maculatella (Hübner, 1796)
Mirificarma minimella Huemer & Karsholt, 2001
Mirificarma pallidipulchra (Walsingham, 1904)
Mirificarma rhodoptera (Mann, 1866)
Mirificarma scissella (Chretien, 1915)
interruptella species-group
Mirificarma burdonella (Rebel, 1930)
Mirificarma cabezella (Chretien, 1925)
Mirificarma constricta Pitkin, 1984
Mirificarma cytisella (Treitschke, 1833)
Mirificarma fasciata Pitkin, 1984
Mirificarma flavonigrella (Chretien, 1915)
Mirificarma interrupta (Curtis, 1827)
Mirificarma lentiginosella (Zeller, 1839)
Mirificarma monticolella (Rebel, 1931)
Mirificarma mulinella (Zeller, 1839)
Mirificarma ocellinella (Chretien, 1915)
Mirificarma pederskoui Huemer & Karsholt, 1999
Mirificarma ulicinella (Staudinger, 1859)

Status unclear
Mirificarma obscurella (Hübner, [1817]), described as Tinea obscurella (preocc.)

References

 
Gelechiini